The Equestrian statue of Hubert Lyautey is a public sculpture that commemorates Hubert Lyautey, the first Resident-general of the French protectorate in Morocco, in Casablanca, Morocco.

History

Sultan Mohammed V, Resident-general Charles Noguès, Lyautey's widow Inès de Bourgoing, French minister Guy La Chambre, and other notables attended the ceremony, at which French Academician Louis Gillet gave a florid speech.

A Moroccan stamp of 1946 pictures the statue. 

In April 1959, the statue was relocated to the grounds of the nearby French consulate-general in Casablanca, where it remains visible from the square. In 2020, a petition requested the removal of the statue from public view, given its symbolism of Colonial oppression under the French protectorate regime.

See also
 Boufarik colonization monument

Notes

Buildings and structures in Casablanca
History of Casablanca
Tourist attractions in Casablanca